Myawaddy TV (abbreviated MWD) is a Myanmar military-owned propaganda network based in Yangon and Naypyidaw, Myanmar.

History 
Myawaddy TV was launched on the 27 March 1995, in commemoration of the Myanmar's Armed Forces Day. Its programming is also broadcast over the AsiaSat 2 satellite. It was used in 2021 to formally announce the military takeover of Myanmar. In response to the coup, Facebook removed the page of the military-owned Myawaddy TV Network, for violating Facebook policy that prohibits organizations that promote hate speech or violence. This was later followed by YouTube which terminated their channel page along with MRTV for similar reason.

Expansion 
In 2012, after the completion of a new TV station in Naypyidaw, MWD launched six new digital channels and increased its broadcasting hours on its digital channels so as to better compete with other local television stations.

Channels 
All channels from MWD television network are  24-hour free-to-air television channels. Some channels are transmitted in both Analogue and Digital system. The current channels of MWD television network are -

Programming

TV programs
Melody World

TV series
Legends of Warriors

See also

 Myanmar Radio and Television
 MRTV-4
 Myanmar International

References

Television channels in Myanmar
Television channels and stations established in 1995
1995 establishments in Myanmar